Tania Elías Calles Wolf (born April 17, 1979 in Mexico City) is a Mexican sailor. She is the great-granddaughter of general Plutarco Elías Calles. At 6 years old she started in the sport of sailing and she has competed at four Olympic Games.

She participated in the Europe dinghy category at the 2000 Summer Olympics at Sydney, Australia. She then participated at the 2002 Central American and Caribbean Games where she gained the gold medal. During the 2003 Pan American Games in Santo Domingo, Dominican Republic she won the gold medal in the Radial category. She also participated at the 2004 Summer Olympicsat Athens, Greece where she finished number twelve. In 2005 she won the bronze medal at the World Championships in Europe. In 2006 she won the bronze medal at the Women's Laser Radial World Championship, as well as the gold medal at the 2006 Central American and Caribbean Games. In 2007, she finished second at the World Championship held in Portugal, winning a spot to the 2008 Summer Olympics in Beijing, China. She won a silver medal at the 2007 Pan American Games in Rio de Janeiro, Brazil, and finished 13th at the Olympic Games in 2008. She established a World Guinness Record to seek sponsorships in March 2010 for the longest distance sailed unattended in a dinghy (300 nm).  In 2011, at the World Championships in Perth, Australia she obtained qualification to the 2012 Summer Olympics.  At the London Games she finished in 10th place in the women's laser radial. She is a member of the athlete commission for the World Antidoping Agency since 2012 and the representative for high performance athletes at her National Antidoping Committee. Writer and author of her autobiography called "The Challenge, in pursuit of Olympic Glory" released in the summer of 2013.

References

External links
 
 
 
  

1979 births
Living people
Olympic sailors of Mexico
Mexican female sailors (sport)
Sailors at the 2000 Summer Olympics – Europe
Sailors at the 2004 Summer Olympics – Europe
Sailors at the 2007 Pan American Games
Sailors at the 2008 Summer Olympics – Laser Radial
Sailors at the 2012 Summer Olympics – Laser Radial
Pan American Games medalists in sailing
Pan American Games silver medalists for Mexico
Medalists at the 2007 Pan American Games
21st-century Mexican women